Events in chess in 1916:

Chess events in brief
 The 1st Isaac Rice Memorial Tournament – fourteen participants played in New York City, from January 18 to February 4, 1916. Wealthy German–American inventor Isaac Leopold Rice (1850–1915) was a lover of chess (Rice Gambit) and a patron of chess competitions. The event included two stages (preliminaries and final). The preliminaries started as a round-robin tournament. Five players qualified for the final. José Raúl Capablanca played superior chess in the preliminaries. Since the results of the preliminaries carried over into the finals, Capablanca with a 3½-point lead was a heavy favorite to win the tournament. Dawid Janowski, Boris Kostić and Abraham Kupchik tied for 2nd-4th, and Oscar Chajes took 5th place. The final tournament was won by Chajes (who beat Capablanca) and Janowski, ahead of Capablanca, Kostić and Kupchik. Summary, the winner was Capablanca (+12 –1 =4), followed by Janowski 11 points, Chajes 10½ points, Kostić and Kupchik 10 points each.

Tournaments
 Triberg chess tournament (Triangular), won by Efim Bogoljubow ahead of Ilya Rabinovich and Alexey Selezniev, 1915/16.
 London (the 26th London championship), won by Theodor Germann and Edward Guthlac Sergeant, 1915/16.
 New York City (Rice Memorial), won by José Raúl Capablanca followed by Dawid Janowski, Oscar Chajes, Boris Kostić and Abraham Kupchik, 18 January – 4 February.
 New York City (Manhattan Chess Club Championship), won by Kupchik.
 Vancouver (the 1st British Columbia Championship), won by John Ewing, finished 25 February.
 Warsaw won by Moishe Lowtzky and Akiba Rubinstein, followed by Jan Kleczyński, Jr., Zdzisław Belsitzmann and Alexander Flamberg, March.
 Chicago (the 17th Western Chess Association), won by Edward Lasker ahead of Jackson Whipps Showalter, finished 23 August.
 Milan (the 1st Torneo Nazionale Crespi) won by Arturo Reggio ahead of G. Cenni and A. Dolci.
 Triberg won by I. Rabinovich ahead of E. Bogoljubow and A. Selezniev.
 Amsterdam won by Max Marchand ahead of Adolf Georg Olland.
 Copenhagen (the 9th Nordic Chess Championship), won by Paul Johner ahead of Orla Hermann Krause, Otto von Löwenborg and M. Marchand.
 Copenhagen (Nordic-ch, B-tournament), won by Karl Berndtsson ahead of O. Nilsson.
 Stockholm won by Gustaf Nyholm ahead of E. Jakobson.
 London (the 27th London championship), won by E.G. Sergeant.
 Brno won by Julius Brach ahead of J. Dobiaš.
 Brno won by J. Dobiaš followed by F. Nachtikal, J. Brach and J. Rašovsky.
 Běluň won by Karel Opočenský ahead of Jan Schulz.
 Budapest (Quadrangular), won by Gyula Breyer followed by Zoltán von Balla, Richard Réti, Johannes Esser.
 Vienna (the 8th Leopold Trebitsch Memorial Tournament) (Trianglular), won by Carl Schlechter ahead of Milan Vidmar and Arthur Kaufmann, 1916/17.
 Łódź won by A. Rubinstein ahead of Gersz Salwe and Teodor Regedziński, 1916/17.

Matches
 Emanuel Lasker beat Siegbert Tarrasch (+5 –0 =1) in Berlin.
 Akiba Rubinstein won against Moishe Lowtzky (+2 –0 =1), play-off in Warsaw.
 Edward Guthlac Sergeant beat Theodor Germann (+2 –0 =0), play-off in London.
 Arthur Kaufmann defeated Savielly Tartakower (+2 –0 =2) in Vienna.
 Alexander Alekhine won against Alexander Evensohn (+2 –1 =0) in Kiev.
 Siegbert Tarrasch defeated Jacques Mieses (+7 –2 =4) in Berlin; prize was 1/2 pound of butter.

Births
 7 January - Paul Keres born in Narva, Estonia. EST-ch 1935,42,42,45,53. GM 1950.
 4 February - Octav Troianescu born in Romania. ROU-ch 1946,54,56,57. IM 1950.
 6 May - Povilas Tautvaišas born in Lithuania.
 11 May - Osmo Ilmari Kaila born in Helsinki, Finland; twice FIN-ch 1939, 1954. IM 1952.
 15 May - Vincenzo Castaldi born in Marradi, Italy; seven times ITA-ch. IM 1950.
 20 August - Paul Felix Schmidt born in Narva, Estonia; twice EST-ch 1936, 1937 and GER-ch 1941. IM 1950.
 3 September - Alexander Koblencs born in Riga, Latvia. LAT-ch 1941,45,46,49. IM.
 16 September - Vernon Dilworth born in England. Dilworth variation.
 18 November - Miguel Cuéllar Gacharná born in Colombia; eight times COL-ch, IM 1957.

Deaths
 5 July - Friedrich Köhnlein died in the Battle of Somme, France.
 26 July - Henry Charlick died in Adelaide, Australia, the 1st AUS-ch 1887.
 2 October - Robert Henry Barnes died in New Zealand.
 27 December - Hugo Süchting died in Valluhn, Germany.

References

 
20th century in chess
Chess by year